She's a Fox is a 2009 semi-autobiographical short film written and directed by Cameron Sawyer. It stars Jake Nutty and Academy Award nominee Hailee Steinfeld. The story follows sixth grader Cameron Sawyer as he pursues the most popular girl in his elementary school.

Plot
Sixth grader Cameron Sawyer is a member of a gang of "bad boys" who constantly terrorize the other kids at their school. Though Cameron acts tough in front of his friends, he has a crush on Talia Alden, a classmate who has been dating a boy named Jake Magnum since second grade. After being ignored by Talia, Cameron decides to leave his gang and abandon his mullet in pursuit of Talia. After some time trying to get Talia to notice him, Cameron wins the school "Fun Run", beating Jake and gaining her attention.

At a party, Cameron is asked what he thinks of Talia. After praying to God for guidance, he finally says, "She's a fox". Talia and Cameron begin to date, and their first kiss is captured in a photo booth. One day Cameron, Talia, and their friends are running when they are ambushed by Cameron's old gang, led by his former best friend Mitch. The gang eggs Cameron and his friends. While he tries to stand up to Mitch, Cameron is immediately defeated.

After the confrontation, Talia breaks up with Cameron. He goes to her house to talk to her, but leaves when he finds her with Jake. The film ends with Cameron biking away while "Love Hurts" by Nazareth plays.

Cast
 Jake Nutty – Cameron Sawyer
 Hailee Steinfeld – Talia Alden
 Anthony Matthew Scott – Mitch Fallin
 Troy Romzek – Jake Magnum
 Stephanie Drapeau – Mrs. Woodhouse
 Cameron Sawyer – Himself/narrator
 Erin Sossamon – Amber McMillan
 Katrina Johnson - School Girl
 Cristal Guel - School Kid

Reception 
She's a Fox was an Official Selection in numerous film festivals throughout the United States and internationally, most notably the Cannes Short Film Corner, Heartland Film Festival, Edinburgh International Film Festival, Cleveland International Film Festival and the Academy-accredited LA Shorts Fest. Received well by jurists and audiences alike, the film has received a number of awards.

Awards

References

External links 
 Official website
 

2009 short films
2009 films
2000s English-language films